Andrei Sergeyevich Demchenko (born 1 July 1993) is a Russian football player. He plays for FC Salyut Belgorod.

Club career
He made his debut in the Russian Professional Football League for FC Afips Afipsky on 28 July 2016 in a game against FC Angusht Nazran.

He made his Russian Football National League debut for FC Chayka Peschanokopskoye on 7 July 2019 in a game against FC Chertanovo Moscow.

References

External links
 

1993 births
Sportspeople from Rostov-on-Don
Living people
Russian people of Ukrainian descent
Russian footballers
Association football defenders
FC Rostov players
FC Solyaris Moscow players
FC SKA Rostov-on-Don players
FC Sokol Saratov players
FC Chayka Peschanokopskoye players
FC Irtysh Omsk players
FC Salyut Belgorod players
Russian First League players
Russian Second League players